Hikaaitaan or Hikāyatān (pronunciation: , lit. ‘realities’) is a title given to the semi-legendary set of 11 tales (hikayat), composed in the Gurmukhi Persian language (with a few words in the Majha dialect), whose authorship is historically and traditionally attributed to Guru Gobind Singh. It is the last composition of the second scripture of Sikhs, Dasam Granth, and is believed to be appended to Zafarnamah—the letter to Mughal king Aurangzeb.

Historically and traditionally, the set of tales was written at Dina, Punjab, in 1704 CE. In total, there are 11 tales—composed of 752 couplets; however, historically, the first hikayat is Zafarnama, which brings the count to 12. Each tale begins with praise of the Almighty. This composition is present in all old manuscripts, including those of Mani Singh, Motibagh, Sangrur, and Patna manuscripts.

Authorship and relation with Zafarnama 
As per early Sikh historical resources, Parchi Patshahi Dasvin (Sevadas, 1741) and Gurbilas Patshahi 10 (Kuir Singh, 1751), hikayats were composed by Guru Gobind Singh at Dina Kangar, Punjab and is part of Zafarnamah which was sent along with Zafarnama. Koer Singh believes that Guru Gobind Singh had written 12 hikayats in Zafarnama. In Sakhi 13, Sevadas mentioned that Guru Gobind Singh had written fables of many kings and also mentioned his own history in Zafarnama.

The historical and traditional view is that all the Hikayats was composed by Guru Gobind Singh himself, to make Aurangzeb realize his folly in breaking oath of Quran, improve his decision-making ability on the basis of facts, and to check the activities of different departments of his government. Pundit Narain Singh, who did an exogenesis of Dasam Granth, also had the same view. Many of these tales are the Persian translations of the narratives in Charitropakhyan, which serves as an additional proof of single authorship of both compositions.

A few modern scholars claim that hikayats are not part of Zafarnama, as in their viewpoint these tales do not show any relation with the letter. and was written by court poets.

Tales 
The following are tales and brief descriptions of the same:
Tale of Guru Gobind Singh and King Aurangzeb- An autobiography of Guru Gobind Singh that includes philosophical, political, and satirical aspects.
Tale of King Daleep and His Four Sons- Guru Gobind Singh Ji had lost his four sons and was a direct reference to that.
Tale of King of China- Explaining the qualities of a perfect ruler, with political and philosophical aspects.
Tale of King Subhat Singh and Bachitarmati- How women are equal to men and how the queen conquered areas from Rajasthan to Poland.
Tale of King Sabal Singh
Tale of King Chakrawati and Qazi Daughter
Tale of King Darab and Queen of Rome-
Tale of Princess of Bilistan
Tale of King of France and His Wife
Tale of King Mayindra and Advisor's Daughter
Tale of King Sher Shah and Tycoon's Daughter
Tale of Pathan Raheem Khan and His Wife

Relationship with Sri Charitropakhyan 
The following is a list of Hikayats which are similar to narratives in Charitropakhyan. In fact, many of these are the Persian translations of the narratives in Charitropakhyan.
 Hikayat 4 and Charitra 52
 Hikayat 5 and Charitra 267
 Hikayat 8 and Charitra 118
 Hikayat 9 and Charitra 290
 Hikayat 11 and Charitra 246

The similarity of narratives in Hikayats and Charitropakhyan serves as an additional proof of single authorship.

References

External links 
 Read Hikayatan online

Dasam Granth
Indian literature
Persian literature